Celina Leffler (born 9 April 1996 in Lübeck) is a German athlete competing in the combined events. She represented 2016 World Indoor Championships finishing eleventh. Earlier she won the gold medal at the 2013 World Youth Championships.

Competition record

Personal bests
Outdoor
100 metres – 11.72 (+1.1 m/s, Weinheim 2014)
200 metres – 23.90 (-0.5 m/s, Eugene 2014)
800 metres – 2:18.03 (Ulm 2014)
100 metres hurdles – 13.63 (+1.0 m/s, Jena 2015)
High jump – 1.77 (Neuwied-Engers 2015)
Long jump – 6.38 (+0.3 m/s, Bydgoszcz 2017)
Shot put – 14.09 (Bydgoszcz 2017)
Javelin throw – 43.73 (Neuwied-Engers 2015)
Heptathlon – 6070 (Bydgoszcz 2017)
Indoor
800 metres – 2:22.19 (Hamburg 2016)
60 metres hurdles – 8.47 (Neubrandenburg 2015)
High jump – 1.70 (Portland 2016)
Long jump – 6.16 (Ludwigshafen 2015)
Shot put – 14.35 (Hamburg 2016)
Pentathlon – 4347 (Hamburg 2016)

References

Living people
1996 births
German heptathletes
Sportspeople from Lübeck
20th-century German women
21st-century German women